Gorham High School is a public, co-educational school located in Gorham, New Hampshire. Students are enrolled from the surrounding areas of Gorham, Randolph, and Shelburne. The school enrolls students in grades 6 through 12.

Sport 
Sports at Gorham High School include men's and women's soccer, cross country, basketball, alpine skiing, baseball, and softball in NHIAA class S.

Academic activities 
Gorham High School has a Math League, National Honor Society, National Junior Honor Society, FBLA (Future Business Leaders of America), a Middle and High School Student Council Network, a school newspaper entitled the Kaleidoscope Tribune, a Community Service Group (CSG), a Cancer Outreach Organization (a branch of CSG) and many more.

The school has had success with the "We The People...."...Bicentennial Constitution competition.  In 1992, 14 members of the class of 1994 (and several from the class of 1993) won the statewide competition, then went on to win the Northeastern Regional in Washington, D.C.

References 

About Gorham Middle/High School
NH District Highlights

External links
Gorham Middle & High School official page

Schools in Coös County, New Hampshire
Public high schools in New Hampshire
Gorham, New Hampshire